Nikolaos Nikolopoulos (born  1958) is a Greek politician. He has served as Member of the Greek Parliament from 2009 to 2019 and previously from 1989 to 2007. He formerly sat as an Independent, after leaving the Independent Greeks.

Life and education
Nikolaso Nikolopoulos studied politics at Panteion University followed by Social Theology at the University of Athens. He subsequently completed an MBA in Economics and Management and worked as a banker. He is married to Anastasia Manolopoulou with three children.

Political career
Nikolopoulos was first elected as a Member of Parliament in 1989 representing Achaea for New Democracy. He served in this role until 2007. He was elected again in 2009. During the talks on the Cypriot accession to the European Union he served on the Committee of Greek and Cypriot ministers for Cyprus’ accession to the EU. From 21 June 2012 until 12 July 2012, he served as Deputy Minister of Labour, Social Security and Welfare Greece in the New Democracy-PASOK-DIMAR coalition government. He resigned following disagreements and was subsequently removed from the Parliamentary Group of New Democracy and then sat with the Independent Democratic MPs. He joined the Independent Greeks in 2014 He was removed from the Independent Greeks Parliamentary Group in November 2015.

Controversy
Nikolopoulos attracted international attention after he tweeted abuse to the Prime Minister of Luxembourg, Xavier Bettel after Bettel announced his engagement to his same-sex partner. Nikolopoulos tweeted to Bettel "FROM EUROPE OF NATION STATES… TO A EUROPE OF FAGGOT MATES!!! The Prime Minister of Luxembourg got engaged with his beloved!!" Bettel replied to his tweet stating "Hello, I heard you want to tell me something, but I don’t speak Greek. Sorry" and stated that Greek-Luxembourg relations "won’t be affected by the comments of an isolated politician." Nikolopoulos later claimed he "copied" the message from a "blog" and likened homosexuality to "paedophilia and bestiality" which he claimed were "accepted in Germany and The Netherlands".

References

Living people
1958 births
Greek bankers
Greek MPs 1989–1990
Greek MPs 1990–1993
Greek MPs 1993–1996
Greek MPs 1996–2000
Greek MPs 2000–2004
Greek MPs 2004–2007
Greek MPs 2009–2012
Greek MPs 2012 (May)
Greek MPs 2012–2014
Greek MPs 2015 (February–August)
Greek MPs 2015–2019
MPs of Achaea
Independent Greeks politicians
Independent politicians in Greece
National and Kapodistrian University of Athens alumni
New Democracy (Greece) politicians
Panteion University alumni
Politicians from Patras